Air and Space Museum may refer to:

Europe

France
 Musée de l’air et de l’espace, in Le Bourget, Paris

Ukraine
 Air and Space Museum in Chernivtsi

North America

Canada
 Canadian Air and Space Museum, in Downsview, Toronto, Canada

United States

 Pima Air & Space Museum, in Tucson, Arizona
 Jimmy Doolittle Air & Space Museum, within Travis Air Force Base in Fairfield, California
 San Diego Air & Space Museum, in California
 Peterson Air and Space Museum, within Peterson Air Force Base, near Colorado Springs, Colorado
 Wings Over the Rockies Air and Space Museum, on the former grounds of Lowry Air Force Base in Denver, Colorado
 Greater Saint Louis Air & Space Museum, at St. Louis Downtown Airport, Cahokia, Illinois
 Intrepid Sea, Air & Space Museum, in New York City, N.Y., U.S.
 International Women's Air & Space Museum, in Cleveland, Ohio
 Armstrong Air and Space Museum, in Wapakoneta, Ohio
 Stafford Air & Space Museum, in Weatherford, Oklahoma
 Tulsa Air and Space Museum & Planetarium, in Oklahoma
 Oregon Air and Space Museum, in Eugene, Oregon
 Strategic Air and Space Museum, near Ashland, Nebraska
 South Dakota Air and Space Museum, in Box Elder, South Dakota
 Virginia Air and Space Center, a museum and educational facility in Hampton, Virginia, U.S.
 National Air and Space Museum, of the Smithsonian Institution in Washington, D.C., plus its annex at Washington Dulles International Airport

See also
 Aviation museum
 List of aerospace museums